Diksmuide Heliport  is a private heliport located near Diksmuide, West Flanders, Belgium.

See also
 List of airports in Belgium

References

External links 
 Airport record for Diksmuide Heliport at Landings.com

Airports in West Flanders
Diksmuide